Paul Islas (born September 14, 1991) is an American soccer player who plays for Fresno Fuego in the USL Premier Development League.

Career

College & Amateur
Islas played college soccer at Fresno Pacific University between 2009 and 2012, where in his senior year he was NSCAA All-America Third Team.

During his time at college, Islas also played for USL PDL club Fresno Fuego in 2012.

Professional career
On January 17, 2013, Islas was selected 19th overall in the 2013 MLS Supplemental Draft by Chivas USA. Islas didn't secure a contract with the Major League Soccer team and returned to Fresno Fuego for their 2013 season.

Islas signed his first professional contract with USL Pro club Charlotte Eagles on July 2, 2013.

References

1991 births
Living people
American soccer players
Association football forwards
Association football midfielders
Charlotte Eagles players
Chivas USA draft picks
Fresno Fuego players
Soccer players from California
Sportspeople from Fresno, California
USL Championship players
United States men's youth international soccer players
USL League Two players
Fresno Pacific Sunbirds men's soccer players